Gözleme is a savory Turkish stuffed turnover. The dough is usually unleavened, and made only with flour, salt and water, but gözleme can be made from yeast dough as well. It is similar to bazlama, but is lightly brushed with butter or oil, whereas bazlama is prepared without fat. The dough is rolled thin, then filled with various toppings, sealed, and cooked over a griddle. Gözleme may sometimes be made from prepackaged hand-rolled leaves of yufka dough.

Fillings for gözleme are numerous and vary by region and personal preference, and include a variety of meats (minced beef, chopped lamb, fresh or smoked seafood, sujuk, pastirma), vegetables (spinach, zucchini, eggplant, leek, chard, various peppers, onion, scallion, shallot, garlic), mushrooms (porcino, chanterelle, truffle), tubers (potatoes, yams, radish), cheeses (feta, Turkish white cheese, lavaş, Beyaz peynir, çökelek, Kasseri, and Kashkaval), as well as eggs, seasonal herbs, and spices.

Etymology 
The word gözleme is derived from the Turkish word közleme, meaning "to grill/cook on the embers". This word can ultimately be traced back to Turkish word köz, meaning "ember". The Ottoman Turkish alphabet had no distinction between k and g sounds, so it is unclear when the consonantal shift from köz to göz happened. The oldest record of the word in a Turkic language is dated back to 1477. It is first attested in Persian-Turkish dictionary  and also found in Evliya Çelebi's Seyahatnâme.

History

Originally a breakfast item or light homemade snack, the comfort food nature of gözleme has allowed it to achieve fast-food status in Turkey in the latter part of the twentieth century, with both simple and gourmet preparations ranging from the traditional (e.g. sauteed minced beef and onion, "kıymalı"; spinach and feta, "ıspanaklı"; potato and chive, "patatesli"; etc.) to the contemporary (e.g. chocolate and orange zest; walnut and banana with honey; smoked salmon and eggs; etc.) proliferating across the country's restaurants, cafes, and food carts. Typically, gözleme is cooked over a sac griddle.

Images

See also

 Bolani
 Çiberek
 Qistibi
 Qutab
 Murtabak
 Paratha

References

External links
 
 

Flatbread dishes
Turkish words and phrases
Turkish cuisine
Stuffed dishes